Fabian Tan (born 25 February 1985 in Singapore) is a former Singaporean retired footballer.

References

Singaporean footballers
Singaporean sportspeople of Chinese descent
Association football defenders
Living people
1985 births
Geylang International FC players